12World, also known as W12, was a street gang located in Shepherd's Bush, London.

History
In 2017, members of 12World harassed the grandmother of 1011 member Micah Bedeau, also known as Horrid1 or Huncho; the incident resulted in him and other 1011 members planning a ride-out against 12World, which was stopped by their arrest in November the same year. In September 2017, an incident occurred between 12World members and rivals from the Royal Borough of Kensington and Chelsea, resulting in a 16-year old being stabbed. 8 12World members were sentenced in 2018 for the attack.

In 2018, Xeneral Imiuru (alias Xeneral Webster), also known as General and a member of 12World, was sentenced to 17 years in prison for the death of Joanne Rand, considered the first death from an acid attack in the UK. He was later sentenced to life in 2020 for attacking a 50-year old prison officer.

In 2019, Ayub Hassan, a member of 12World also known as A1, was stabbed to death in Kensington. His killer was sentenced in September to a minimum of 15 years.

Music
Members of 12World were involved in the UK drill scene; these included Sav12 and S1.

References

Shepherd's Bush
London street gangs
Former gangs in London